The CheyTac Intervention also known as the CheyTac M200, is an American bolt-action sniper rifle manufactured by CheyTac USA, which can also be classified as an anti-materiel rifle. It is fed by a 7-round detachable single-stack magazine (an optional 5-round magazine is also available). It is specifically chambered in either .408 Chey Tac or .375 Chey Tac ammunition. It is based on the EDM Arms Windrunner.

Design details
The CheyTac system consists of three major components:
 .408/.375 CheyTac ammunition
 CheyTac "XTreme Long Distance™" Rifle
 CheyTac Advanced Ballistic Computer

The CheyTac M200 Intervention is a manually operated, rotating bolt sniper rifle. It features a Picatinny rail on the top of its receiver for mounting various optical sights.

Cartridge
The M200 Intervention is chambered in either the .408 CheyTac or .375 CheyTac cartridge. CheyTac specially developed the .408 CheyTac/.375 CheyTac cartridge for long-range use. The cartridge is optimized for accuracy by a balance of the rotational and linear drag, which reduces yaw and precession, and keeps the tip of the projectile pointed along the trajectory. The M200 Intervention is fed through a detachable 7 round box magazine, an optional 5 round box magazine is also available. Alternatively, cartridges can be loaded individually directly into the chamber.

Barrel
The M200 Intervention uses a free floating heavy-fluted barrel, which can be quickly removed for replacement or storage and transportation, and the shroud at the rear serves as a mount for an integral folding bipod and a carrying handle.

Muzzle devices
The M200 Intervention features the McArthur PGRS-1 muzzle brake, which can be used to reduce recoil. The muzzle brake is also removable and can be replaced by an OPSINC suppressor.

Buttstock 
The M200 Intervention has a collapsible and retractable buttstock that is adjustable for length of pull and for easy storage and transportation. The buttstock also contains an integral rear monopod, which is hinged, and can be folded up when not in use.

Day and low light optical sights
There are two different day optical sights available for the M200 Intervention. The standard optical sight is the Nightforce NXS 5.5-22x56 variable magnification telescopic sight with a 56 mm objective. The alternative optical sight is the US Optics SN-9. The night vision system is the AN/PVS-14 GEN III Pinnacle monocular, which attaches to the day optic using the Monoloc device. An AN/PEQ-2 infrared laser provides additional lighting in low-light conditions. The device is attached to a titanium strut.

Accessories 
The M200 Intervention comes with a portable advanced ballistic computer, laser rangefinder binoculars and meteorological and environmental sensor package. All these components, together with the sniper rifle, are part of the CheyTac Long Range Sniper System (LRSS) and are linked to the ballistic computer. It provides all necessary data and calculations for accurate long range firing.
Advanced Ballistic Computer – The CheyTac Advanced Ballistic Computer (ABC) System software package uses tabulated bullet flight data derived from high speed Doppler radar test sessions, and mathematical models to predict ballistic trajectory. It runs on Windows Mobile 2003 and receives input from the Kestrel handheld weather station and Vector IV laser rangefinder binoculars. However, much like other ballistic prediction software, when rounds are used for which no Doppler Radar-established bullet flight data is known, the ABC System relies solely on mathematical ballistic models. Printed data tables are available for manual use.
Meteorological and environmental sensor package – The KESTREL 4000 (or, 4500 NV) meteorological and environmental sensor package measures the wind speed, air temperature, air pressure, relative humidity, wind chill, and dew point. The KESTREL 4500 NV model is compatible with night vision devices.

Accuracy 
The primary intent of the .408 is as an extreme range anti-personnel system.

Variants
The CheyTac Intervention comes in several variants:
 M200 (29 in (737 mm) barrel length)
 M200 Carbine (Now out of production)
 M200 CIV (Civilian Variant)
 M200 RK
 M310 (Single shot and repeater sub-variants all with 29 in (737 mm) barrel length)
 M310 R (Repeater)
 M325 (Single shot, repeater and tactical sub-variants all with 28 in (711 mm) barrel length)
The main capability differences between the different variants are governed by barrel length which determines the obtainable muzzle velocity. Higher muzzle velocity extends the effective range of a rifle, everything else being equal. The M200 and the M200 Carbine are limited to official customers like military forces and come with a detachable box magazine and a telescopic stock, whilst the other variants have a glass-fiber fixed McMillan A5 stock and are available for the general public.

Derivatives

CheyTac M300 Intervention (Carbon Fiber) 
The CheyTac M300 Intervention (Carbon Fiber) is a modern rendition of the M200 Intervention. CheyTac utilized lightweight materials such as aluminum and carbon fiber to create a lightweight and portable sniper rifle.

The M300 Intervention (Carbon Fiber) can be chambered in either .408 CheyTac or .375 CheyTac cartridge and uses a 7-round detachable box magazine. It features all of the standard features of the M200 Intervention and also features a full-length Picatinny rails at 3, 6, 9 and 12 o’clock positions for mounting various accessories, such as accuracy enhancements, a  fluted barrel (custom lengths are also available), a barrel twist rate of 1:13.25" twist for the .408 CheyTac cartridge and 1:11.25" twist for .375 CheyTac cartridge, a detachable muzzle brake, a fully adjustable folding buttstock that has an adjustable cheek weld, a recoil pad and an optional monopod, an adjustable pistol grip, an adjustable match trigger and flush cups for weapon sling mounting.

CheyTac M300 Intervention (Composite) 
The CheyTac M300 Intervention (Composite) is a civilian/sporting variant of the M300 Intervention (Carbon Fiber). It is well suited under challenging terrains due to its lightweight build.

The M300 Intervention (Composite) can be chambered in either .408 CheyTac or .375 CheyTac cartridge and uses a 7-round detachable box magazine. It features a Picatinny rail on the top of its receiver for mounting various optics/scopes and on the bottom portion of the front end of the handguard for optional bipod mounting, a  fluted barrel (custom lengths are also available), a barrel twist rate of 1:13.25" twist for the .408 CheyTac cartridge and 1:11.25" twist for .375 CheyTac cartridge, a detachable muzzle brake, an adjustable buttstock that has an adjustable cheek weld, V-Block and an optional monopod, an adjustable pistol grip, an adjustable match trigger and flush cups for weapon sling mounting.

Users

: Used by 601st Special Forces Group
: Used by GROM operatives.
: Used by Maroon Berets operatives.
: Used by the SAS.

See also
 Accuracy International AX50

References

Further reading

External links

Bolt-action rifles of the United States
Sniper rifles of the United States
Weapons and ammunition introduced in 2001
2001 in technology